Vankiva is a locality situated in Hässleholm Municipality, Scania County, Sweden with 340 inhabitants in 2010.

The society 
Besides the church (see below) Vankiva used to have a local store, gas station, train station and school (Vankiva School 1916-2010). The store, gas station and school have been sold and re-purposed. After the train station was decommissioned its station building was used by the local Scouts, Malvan of KFUM-KFUK, until it was razed.

Vankiva have large football ground for the local club Vankiva IF with several grass fields and a gravel one. The football club yearly hosts a tournament called Ivar Persson Cup. On the same grounds as the football club is also a community building called Åttingastugan run by the local community and used for holiday celebrations, parties and LAN parties.

Vankiva Church 
Vankiva Church is located outside the village center. It was constructed in the 12th century but has been expanded and renovated several times since.

References 

Populated places in Hässleholm Municipality
Populated places in Skåne County